Kwok Cheung is an electrical engineer working at Alstom Grid in Redmond, Washington.

Cheung was named a Fellow of the Institute of Electrical and Electronics Engineers (IEEE) in 2014 for his work in the development and implementation of energy and market management systems for control centers.

References 

Fellow Members of the IEEE
Living people
21st-century American engineers
Year of birth missing (living people)
American electrical engineers